Student union may refer to:

 Students' union, a student organization at many colleges and universities dedicated to student governance
 Student union building (a.k.a. student center, campus activity center, etc.), a physical building found on universities and college campuses